Shunning can be the act of social rejection, or emotional distance. In a religious context, shunning is a formal decision by a denomination or a congregation to cease interaction with an individual or a group, and follows a particular set of rules. It differs from, but may be associated with, excommunication.

Social rejection occurs when a person or group deliberately avoids association with, and habitually keeps away from an individual or group. This can be a formal decision by a group, or a less formal group action which will spread to all members of the group as a form of solidarity. It is a sanction against association, often associated with religious groups and other tightly knit organizations and communities. Targets of shunning can include persons who have been labeled as apostates, whistleblowers, dissidents, strikebreakers, or anyone the group perceives as a threat or source of conflict. Social rejection has been established to cause psychological damage and has been categorized as torture or punishment. Mental rejection is a more individual action, where a person subconsciously or willfully ignores an idea, or a set of information related to a particular viewpoint. Some groups are made up of people who shun the same ideas.

Social rejection was and is a punishment in many customary legal systems. Such sanctions include the ostracism of ancient Athens and the still-used kasepekang in Balinese society.

Overview

Shunning can be broken down into behaviours and practices that seek to accomplish either or both of two primary goals.
 To modify the behaviour of a member. This approach seeks to influence, encourage, or coerce normative behaviours from members, and may seek to dissuade, provide disincentives for, or to compel avoidance of certain behaviours. Shunning may include disassociating from a member by other members of the community who are in good standing. It may include more antagonistic psychological behaviours (described below). This approach may be seen as either corrective or punitive (or both) by the group membership or leadership, and may also be intended as a deterrent.
 To remove or limit the influence of a member (or former member) over other members in a community. This approach may seek to isolate, to discredit, or otherwise dis-empower such a member, often in the context of actions or positions advocated by that member. For groups with defined membership criteria, especially based on key behaviours or ideological precepts, this approach may be seen as limiting damage to the community or its leadership. This is often paired with some form of excommunication.

Some less often practiced variants may seek to:
 Remove a specific member from general external influence to provide an ideological or psychological buffer against external views or behaviour. The amount can vary from severing ties to opponents of the group up to and including severing all non-group-affiliated intercourse.

Shunning is usually approved of (if sometimes with regret) by the group engaging in the shunning, and usually highly disapproved of by the target of the shunning, resulting in a polarization of views. Those subject to the practice respond differently, usually depending both on the circumstances of the event, and the nature of the practices being applied. Extreme forms of shunning have damaged some individuals' psychological and relational health. Responses to the practice have developed, mostly around anti-shunning advocacy; such advocates highlight the detrimental effects of many of such behaviors, and seek to limit the practice through pressure or law. Such groups often operate supportive organizations or institutions to help victims of shunning to recover from damaging effects, and sometimes to attack the organizations practicing shunning, as a part of their advocacy.

In many civil societies, kinds of shunning are practiced de facto or de jure, to coerce or avert behaviours or associations deemed unhealthy. This can include:
restraining orders or peace bonds (to avoid abusive relationships)
court injunctions to disassociate (to avoid criminal association or temptation)
medical or psychological instructing to avoid associating (to avoid hazardous relations, i.e. alcoholics being instructed to avoid friendship with non-recovering alcoholics, or asthmatics being medically instructed to keep to smoke-free environs)
using background checks to avoid hiring people who have criminal records (to avoid association with felons, even when the crimes have nothing to do with the job description)

Stealth shunning

Stealth shunning is a practice where a person or an action is silently banned. When a person is silently banned, the group they have been banned from does not interact with them. This can be done by secretly distributing a blacklist announcing the person's wrongdoing.

It can happen informally when all people in a group or email list each conclude that they do not want to interact with the person. When an action is silently banned, requests for that action are either ignored or refused with faked explanations.

Effects
Shunning is often used as a pejorative term to describe any organizationally mandated disassociation, and has acquired a connotation of abuse and relational aggression. This is due to the sometimes extreme damage caused by its disruption to normal relationships between individuals, such as friendships and family relations. Disruption of established relationships certainly causes pain, which is at least an unintended consequence of the practices described here, though it may also in many cases be an intended, coercive consequence. This pain, especially when seen as unjustly inflicted, can have secondary general psychological effects on self-worth and self-confidence, trust and trustworthiness, and can, as with other types of trauma, impair psychological function.

Shunning often involves implicit or explicit shame for a member who commits acts seen as wrong by the group or its leadership. Such shame may not be psychologically damaging if the membership is voluntary and the rules of behavior were clear before the person joined. However, if the rules are arbitrary, if the group membership is seen as essential for personal security, safety, or health, or if the application of the rules is inconsistent, such shame can be highly destructive. This can be especially damaging if perceptions are attacked or controlled, or certain tools of psychological pressure applied. Extremes of this cross over the line into psychological torture and can be permanently scarring.

A key detrimental effect of some of the practices associated with shunning relate to their effect on relationships, especially family relationships. At its extremes, the practices may destroy marriages, break up families, and separate children and their parents. The effect of shunning can be very dramatic or even devastating on the shunned, as it can damage or destroy the shunned member's closest familial, spousal, social, emotional, and economic bonds.

Shunning contains aspects of what is known as relational aggression in psychological literature. When used by church members and member-spouse parents against excommunicant parents it contains elements of what psychologists call parental alienation. Extreme shunning may cause traumas to the shunned (and to their dependents) similar to what is studied in the psychology of torture.

Shunning is also a mechanism in family estrangement.  When an adult child, sibling, or parent physically and/or emotionally cuts himself off from the family without proper justification, the act traumatizes the family.

Civil rights implications
Some aspects of shunning may also be seen as being at odds with civil rights or human rights, especially those behaviours that coerce and attack. When a group seeks to have an effect through such practices outside its own membership, for instance when a group seeks to cause financial harm through isolation and disassociation, they can come at odds with their surrounding civil society, if such a society enshrines rights such as freedom of association, conscience, or belief. Many civil societies do not extend such protections to the internal operations of communities or organizations so long as an ex-member has the same rights, prerogatives, and power as any other member of the civil society.

In cases where a group or religion is state-sanctioned, a key power, or in the majority (e.g. in Singapore), a shunned former member may face severe social, political, and/or financial costs.

In religion

Christianity

However, not all Christian scholars or denominations agree on this interpretation of these verses.

Anabaptism

Certain sects of the Amish—an Anabaptist community—practice shunning or meidung. Historically, the Schwarzenau Brethren practiced a form of shunning that they called "avoidance," a refusal to eat with even a family member whom the church had placed in "avoidance."

Catholicism
Prior to the Code of Canon Law of 1983, in rare cases (known as excommunication vitandi) the Catholic Church expected adherents to shun an excommunicated member in secular matters. 

In 1983, the distinction between vitandi and others (tolerandi) was abolished, and thus the expectation is not made anymore.

Jehovah's Witnesses

Jehovah's Witnesses practise a form of shunning which they refer to as "disfellowshipping". A disfellowshipped person is not to be greeted either socially or at their meetings. Disfellowshipping follows a decision of a judicial committee established by a local congregation that a member is unrepentantly guilty of a "serious sin".

Sociologist Andrew Holden's research indicates that many Witnesses who would otherwise defect because of disillusionment with the organization and its teachings retain affiliation out of fear of being shunned and losing contact with friends and family members.

Judaism

Cherem is the highest ecclesiastical censure in the Jewish community. It is the total exclusion of a person from the Jewish community. It is still used in the Ultra-Orthodox and Chassidic community. In the 21st century, sexual abuse victims and their families who have reported abuse to civil authorities have experienced shunning in the Orthodox communities of New York and Australia. Orthodox Jewish men who refuse to grant their wives a divorce are sometimes subject to shunning or shaming, as a form of social pressure intended to compel the husband to allow his wife to leave the marriage. This pressure can take the form of refusing to allow the husband to perform certain religious rituals in the synagogue, refusing his business in commerce, legal solutions such as restraining orders, and public shaming.

Baháʼí faith

Members of the Baháʼí Faith are expected to shun those that have been declared Covenant-breakers, and expelled from the religion, by the head of their faith. Covenant-breakers are defined as leaders of schismatic groups that resulted from challenges to legitimacy of Baháʼí leadership, as well as those who follow or refuse to shun them. Unity is considered the highest value in the Baháʼí Faith, and any attempt at schism by a Baháʼí is considered a spiritual sickness, and a negation of that for which the religion stands.

Church of Scientology

The Church of Scientology asks its members to quit all communication with Suppressive Persons (those whom the Church deems antagonistic to Scientology). The practice of shunning in Scientology is termed disconnection. Members can disconnect from any person they already know, including existing family members. Many examples of this policy's application have been established in court. It used to be customary to write a "disconnection letter" to the person being disconnected from, and to write a public disconnection notice, but these practices have not continued. 

The Church states that typically only people with "false data" about Scientology are antagonistic, so it encourages members to first attempt to provide "true data" to these people. According to official Church statements, disconnection is only used as a last resort and only lasts until the antagonism ceases. Failure to disconnect from a Suppressive Person is itself labelled a Suppressive act. In the United States, the Church has tried to argue in court that disconnection is a constitutionally protected religious practice. However, this argument was rejected because the pressure put on individual Scientologists to disconnect means it is not voluntary.

See also 
 Al Wala' Wal Bara' – Islamic concept of friendship toward fellow Muslims, and distance from non-Muslims.
 Anathema
 Apostasy in Islam
 Cancel culture
 Criminalization
 Damnatio memoriae – practice of destroying evidence for the existence of a person
 Dima Yakovlev Law
 Ghosting (behavior) also known as simmering or icing
 Interdict
 Magnitsky Act
 Mark and Avoid – a practice of The Way International
 No platform
 Passive-aggressive behaviour
 Persona non grata
 Silent treatment
 Social exclusion

References

Citations

Sources

Further reading

 McCowan, Karen, The Oregon Register-Guard, Cast Out: Religious Shunning Provides an Unusual Background in the Longo and Bryant Slayings, March 2, 2003.
 D'anna, Lynnette, "Post-Mennonite Women Congregate to Discuss Abuse", Herizons, March 1, 1993.
 Esua, Alvin J., and Esau Alvin A.J., The Courts and the Colonies: The Litigation of Hutterite Church Disputes, Univ of British Columbia Press, 2004.
 Crossing Over: One Woman's Escape from Amish Life, Ruth Irene Garret, Rick Farrant
 Delivered Unto Satan (Mennonite), Robert L. Bear, 1974, (ASIN B0006CKXQI)
 Children Held Hostage: Dealing with Programmed and Brainwashed Children, Stanley S. Clawar, Brynne Valerie Rivlin, 2003.
 Deviance, Agency, and the Social Control of Women's Bodies in a Mennonite Community, Linda B. Arthur, NWSA Journal, v10.n2 (Summer 1998): pp75(25).

External links
 Disfellowshipping amongst Jehovah's Witnesses
 What Shall We Tell the Children
 Spiritual Shunning
 Article on "Avoidance"/Shunning in Global Anabaptist Mennonite Encyclopedia Online
 The Amish: Technology Practice and Technological Change, (see shunning)
 TV Movie "The Shunning" (US 2011) at imdb about the practice in an Amish community
 Stress and Conflict in an International Religious Movement: The Case of the Bruderhof (Hutterite)
 Ritual and the Social Meaning and Meaninglessness of Religion (Mennonite)
 Rituals, Communication, and Social Systems: The Case of the Old Order Mennonites

 
Disengagement from religion
Punishments in religion
Religious law
Church discipline